Uroleucon is a genus of aphids in the family Aphididae. Most species feed on Asteraceae.

Species
Listed alphabetically within subgenera.
Subgenus Belochilum:
Uroleucon inulae
Subgenus Lambersius:
Uroleucon anomalae  
Uroleucon bradburyi 
Uroleucon breviscriptum 
Uroleucon brevitarsus 
Uroleucon cadens 
Uroleucon caligatum 
Uroleucon canadense 
Uroleucon coloradense 
Uroleucon crepusisiphon 
Uroleucon erigeronense
Uroleucon gravicorne
Uroleucon idahoensis
Uroleucon longirostre
Uroleucon luteolum
Uroleucon macgillivrayae
Uroleucon madia
Uroleucon manitobense
Uroleucon nevadense
Uroleucon nodulum
Uroleucon penderum
Uroleucon queretarense
Uroleucon remaudiereorum
Uroleucon richardsi
Uroleucon suzannae
Uroleucon tenuitarsum
Uroleucon vera
Uroleucon zacatecense
Uroleucon zayasi
Uroleucon zerogutierrezis
Uroleucon zymozionense
 Subgenus Satula:
Uroleucon brachychaetum
Subgenus Uroleucon:
Uroleucon achilleae
 Uroleucon adenocaulonae 
 Uroleucon adesmiae 
 Uroleucon alaskense 
 Uroleucon ambiguum 
 Uroleucon ambrosiae – Brown Ambrosia Aphid
 Uroleucon arnesense 
 Uroleucon asteriae 
 Uroleucon asteromyzon
 Uroleucon asterophagum  
 Uroleucon astronomus 
 Uroleucon atripes 
 Uroleucon bereticum 
 Uroleucon bicolor 
 Uroleucon bielawskii 
 Uroleucon bifrontis 
 Uroleucon boreale 
 Uroleucon brevirostre 
 Uroleucon brevisiphon 
 Uroleucon budhium    
 Uroleucon carberriense 
 Uroleucon caspicum 
 Uroleucon chani 
 Uroleucon chilense 
 Uroleucon chondrillae 
 Uroleucon chrysanthemi 
 Uroleucon chrysopsidicola 
 Uroleucon cicerbitae 
 Uroleucon cichorii 
 Uroleucon ciefi 
 Uroleucon cirsicola  
 Uroleucon cirsii – Large Thistle Aphid
 Uroleucon dalmaticum 
 Uroleucon debile 
 Uroleucon deltense 
 Uroleucon doellingeriae 
 Uroleucon dubium  
 Uroleucon elbursicum 
 Uroleucon elephantopicola  
 Uroleucon epilobii 
 Uroleucon essigi 
 Uroleucon eumadiae 
 Uroleucon eupatoricolens 
 Uroleucon fagopyri
 Uroleucon floricola 
 Uroleucon formosanum
 Uroleucon fuchuense 
 Uroleucon fuscaudatum 
 Uroleucon garnicai 
 Uroleucon gigantiphagum 
 Uroleucon gnaphalii 
 Uroleucon gochnatiae 
 Uroleucon gredinae 
 Uroleucon grossum 
 Uroleucon hasanicum 
 Uroleucon heterothecae 
 Uroleucon hieracicola 
 Uroleucon hymenocephali 
 Uroleucon hypochoeridis 
 Uroleucon hyssopii 
 Uroleucon impatiensicolens 
 Uroleucon inulicola  
 Uroleucon iranicum 
 Uroleucon ivae 
 Uroleucon jaceicola 
 Uroleucon kamtshaticum 
 Uroleucon kashmiricum 
 Uroleucon katonkae 
 Uroleucon kikioense 
 Uroleucon kumaoni 
 Uroleucon lactucicola 
 Uroleucon lanceolatum 
 Uroleucon leonardi 
 Uroleucon leontodontis 
 Uroleucon leontopodiicola 
 Uroleucon longisetosum 
 Uroleucon macolai 
 Uroleucon malarguense 
 Uroleucon martini 
 Uroleucon maximilianicola 
 Uroleucon mendocinum 
 Uroleucon mexicanum 
 Uroleucon mierae 
 Uroleucon mongolicum
 Uroleucon monticola
 Uroleucon mulgedii 
 Uroleucon murale 
 Uroleucon nigrotibium  
 Uroleucon nigrotuberculatum – Red Goldenrod Aphid
 Uroleucon obscuricaudatum 
 Uroleucon obscurum 
 Uroleucon ochropus 
 Uroleucon olivei 
 Uroleucon patagonicum 
 Uroleucon paucosensoriatum 
 Uroleucon payuniense 
 Uroleucon penae 
 Uroleucon pepperi 
 Uroleucon picridiphagum 
 Uroleucon picridis 
 Uroleucon pieloui  
 Uroleucon pilosellae
 Uroleucon pseudambrosiae 
 Uroleucon pseudobscurum 
 Uroleucon pseudomuermosum 
 Uroleucon pseudotanaceti 
 Uroleucon ptarmicae 
 Uroleucon pulicariae 
 Uroleucon pyrethri 
 Uroleucon reynoldense 
 Uroleucon riojanum 
 Uroleucon rudbeckiae – Goldenglow Aphid
 Uroleucon russellae 
 Uroleucon saussureae 
 Uroleucon sijpkensi 
 Uroleucon simlaense 
 Uroleucon sinuense 
 Uroleucon skurichinae 
 Uroleucon solirostratum 
 Uroleucon sonchellum 
 Uroleucon sonchi 
 Uroleucon stoetzelae 
 Uroleucon tanaceti 
 Uroleucon tardae 
 Uroleucon teheranense  
 Uroleucon telekiae 
 Uroleucon tessariae 
 Uroleucon tortuosissimae 
 Uroleucon tucumani 
 Uroleucon tussilaginis 
 Uroleucon ussuriense 
 Uroleucon vancouverense 
 Uroleucon vernonicola 
 Uroleucon zinzalae
Subgenus Uromelan:
 Uroleucon acroptilidis 
 Uroleucon adenophorae
 Uroleucon aeneum
 Uroleucon amamianum
 Uroleucon ariegense
 Uroleucon bonitum
 Uroleucon calendulae
 Uroleucon campanulae
 Uroleucon carlinae
 Uroleucon carthami 
 Uroleucon cephalonopli
 Uroleucon compositae
 Uroleucon doronici
 Uroleucon dzhungaricum
 Uroleucon echinatum
 Uroleucon ensifoliae
 Uroleucon eoessigi
 Uroleucon eupatorifoliae
 Uroleucon giganteum
 Uroleucon gobonis
 Uroleucon helenae 
 Uroleucon helianthicola
 Uroleucon helichrysi
 Uroleucon hieracioides 
 Uroleucon illini 
 Uroleucon jaceae
 Uroleucon macrosiphon
 Uroleucon minor
 Uroleucon minosmartelli
 Uroleucon minutum
 Uroleucon montanivorum
 Uroleucon neocampanulae
 Uroleucon nigrocampanulae
 Uroleucon omeishanense
 Uroleucon orientale 
 Uroleucon pachysiphon 
 Uroleucon parvotuberculatum 
 Uroleucon phyteumae 
 Uroleucon rapunculoidis 
 Uroleucon riparium 
 Uroleucon rurale 
 Uroleucon scorzonerae
 Uroleucon scrophulariae 
 Uroleucon seneciocola 
 Uroleucon siculum 
 Uroleucon sileneobium 
 Uroleucon simile 
 Uroleucon solidaginis 
 Uroleucon stachydis  
 Uroleucon syrdariense 
 Uroleucon taraxaci  
 Uroleucon tripartitum 
 Uroleucon triphylli 
 Uroleucon tschuense 
 Uroleucon tuataiae 
 Uroleucon uyguricum 
 Uroleucon verbesinae 
 Uroleucon vernoniae

References

Sternorrhyncha genera
Macrosiphini